Mwdwl-eithin is the highest point on the Denbigh Moors (Welsh: Mynydd Hiraethog) of North Wales. On its summit is a trig point and a ruined building which still provides shelter against a storm. A few metres away is a large raised stone cairn.

The whole area  is underlain by Silurian mudstone which was extensively glaciated during the last British glaciation. The whole area is now very wet moorland dominated by heather (Calluna and Erica spp.) and rushes. Three of the surrounding valleys and depressions have been used for drinking water storage reservoirs, Llyn Alwen, Llyn Aled and Alwen Reservoir.

Mountains and hills of Conwy County Borough
Marilyns of Wales